Carlos Santacreu (born 15 September 1966) is a Spanish sailor. He competed in the Tornado event at the 1992 Summer Olympics.

References

External links
 

1966 births
Living people
Spanish male sailors (sport)
Olympic sailors of Spain
Sailors at the 1992 Summer Olympics – Tornado
Place of birth missing (living people)